Carlton Miniott, formerly Carlton Islebeck is a village and civil parish in the Hambleton district of North Yorkshire, England, on the A61 road  to the immediate west of Thirsk,  north of York.  According to the 2001 census it had a population of 926, increasing to 990 at the 2011 census.

History

The village is mentioned in the Domesday Book of 1086 as Carlton, as is the place-name Islebeck that has been associated with the village. The land was in the possession of Orm, son of Gamal at that time and passed on to Hugh, son of Baldric. It eventually became the property of the Barons de Mowbray. In the early 14th century the lands were purchased by a John Miniott from whom the village now gets its suffix. By the early 15th century the manor had passed out of the Miniott family to the Markenfield and Pigot families. Thereafter, the manor was further divided and passed through other families such as Metcalfe, Folkingham, Hussey, Lamplugh, Clough and Bell.

Governance

The village lies within the Thirsk and Malton UK Parliament constituency. It is in the Thirsk electoral division of the North Yorkshire County Council and the Thirsk ward of Hambleton District Council. The Parish Council has seven councillors including the Chair and meets monthly. The Thirsk ward returns three councillors to the Hambleton District Council and the Thirsk electoral division returns one councillor to the County Council.

Geography

The village is located on the A61, Leeds to Thirsk, road. The nearest settlements are Sowerby, 3 miles (4.8 km) to the east; Thirsk,  to the east; Sandhutton  to the north-west; Skipton-on-Swale  to the south-west and RAF Topcliffe  to the south.

Carlton Miniott is the location for Thirsk railway station, a small station served by the Sunderland to London King's Cross route and the Middlesbrough to Manchester Airport lines.

The village is served by bus services to and from Thirsk.

The soil in the area is a light gravel or sand laid over Keuper marl with some lower lias and alluvium also present.

The 1881 UK Census recorded the population at 380. According to the 2011 UK Census, the population was 962 living in 388 dwellings, of which 763 were over sixteen years old, and of those 507 were in employment.

Village amenities

There is a Post Office situated to the east of the village. There is a playing field near the turn-off for Sandhutton which is cared for and run by a playing field committee. There are a number of public houses, a small holiday lodge site and a fishing lake.

Education

There is a small school situated in on the west side of the village, previously Carlton Miniott Community Primary School, it is now named Carlton Miniott Primary Academy and is part of the Elevate Multi-Academy Trust. The school is within the catchment area for Thirsk School & Sixth Form College.

Religion

On the west side of the village there are two churches, St. Lawrence's Church and Hambleton Evangelical Church. St Lawrence's was rebuilt in 1896 with registers dating to 1706 and is a Grade II listed building. In 1838, a Methodist Chapel was built, but no longer functions as such.

Notable residents

The novelist J. L. Carr was born on 20 May 1912 in one of the railway cottages at Thirsk Junction, between Carlton Miniott and Thirsk, where his father was stationmaster, and attended primary school in the village. Carr wrote:

"I scarcely can believe that from the age of five until we left Carlton Miniott when I was about eight, a better education could have been purchased. I wanted information, and it was provided. I preferred order, and there was order. I needed others to emulate, and they were there. I was learning all the time."

Gallery

References

External links

Villages in North Yorkshire
Civil parishes in North Yorkshire